A purchase returns journal (also known as returns outwards journal/purchase debits daybook) is a prime entry book or a daybook which is used to record purchase returns. In other words, it is the journal which is used to record the goods which are returned to the suppliers. The source document which is used as an evidence in recording transactions into purchase returns journal is the Debit note.

Reasons for purchase returns 
 Damages
 Expiration of products/outdated
 Different brands
 Out of the order
 Delays in receipts

Structure of a purchase returns journal

Structure without a VAT column

Double entry for purchase returns without VAT value 
 Creditors a/c Debit (Account payable) - suppliers $600
 Purchase returns a/c Credit - value $600

Structure with a VAT column

Double entry for purchase returns with a VAT value 
 Creditors a/c Debit - total value  $ 650
 Purchase returns a/c Credit - value $600
 VAT a/c Credit - VAT $50

See also 
 Purchase journal
 Bookkeeping
 Special journals

References 

Accounting journals and ledgers
Accounts payable